Encadenados may refer to:
 Encadenados (song), a 1998 song by Chavela Vargas featuring Miguel Bosé
 Encadenados (1969 TV series), a Mexican telenovela
 Encadenados (1988 TV series), a Mexican telenovela